The Pacotuba National Forest is a national forest in the state of Espírito Santo, Brazil.

Location

The Pacotuba National Forest is in the municipality of Cachoeiro de Itapemirim.
In the south the forest is bounded in part by the Itapemirim River and in part by the Bananal do Norte Experimental Farm.
To the north it is bounded by the quilombola community of Monte Alegre.
It is in the Atlantic Forest biome. Vegetation is semi-deciduous seasonal forest.

The quilombola community of Monte Alegre offers ethnic, cultural and environmental tourism in partnership with the forest and the ministry of tourism.
This includes crafts and gastronomy, expression of traditions and community lifestyle, and guided tours of the forest.

History

The Pacotuba National Forest was created by federal decree on 13 December 2002.
The objective was to promote management of natural resources by encouraging research with emphasis on recovery of degraded areas and development of sustainable methods of exploiting non-timber natural resources.
It became part of the Central Atlantic Forest Ecological Corridor, also created in 2002.
The management plan was issued in June 2011.

Notes

Sources

National forests of Brazil
Protected areas of Espírito Santo